Pingyaogucheng railway station, is a railway station of Datong–Xi'an Passenger Railway that is located between Houji Village and Ducun Village, Pingyao County, Jinzhong, Shanxi, China and about 8 km (5 miles) from Pingyao railway station and 10 km (6 miles) from the Pingyao Ancient City.

It started operation on 1 July 2014, together with the railway. The station was originally named Pingyao South railway station, but was renamed before it started operation.

Railway stations in China opened in 2014
Railway stations in Shanxi